T. A. Bud Bradley (30 April 1938 – 18 March 2022) was a Progressive Conservative party member of the House of Commons of Canada. He was a dentist by career.

Born in Niagara Falls, Ontario, Bradley won the seat for the Haldimand—Norfolk electoral district in the 1979 federal election and was re-elected there in the 1980 and 1984 federal elections. In the 1988 federal election, he was defeated by Bob Speller of the Liberal party. Bradley served in the 31st, 32nd and 33rd Canadian Parliaments.

References

 

1938 births
Living people
Members of the House of Commons of Canada from Ontario
People from Niagara Falls, Ontario
Progressive Conservative Party of Canada MPs